Lloyd Presbyterian Church is a historic African-American Presbyterian church located at 748 Chestnut Street in Winston-Salem, Forsyth County, North Carolina.  It was built between 1900 and 1907, and is a gable-front, rectangular frame church in the Carpenter Gothic style.  It is sheathed in weatherboard and features lancet windows and a small frame steeple, with a bellcast spire and ornamental sawn eave brackets along the top of the tower.

It was listed on the National Register of Historic Places in 1998.

References

African-American history in Winston-Salem, North Carolina
Presbyterian churches in North Carolina
Churches in Winston-Salem, North Carolina
Churches on the National Register of Historic Places in North Carolina
Carpenter Gothic church buildings in North Carolina
Churches completed in 1907
19th-century Presbyterian church buildings in the United States
National Register of Historic Places in Winston-Salem, North Carolina